Abd al-Ilah of Hejaz,  (also written Abdul Ilah or Abdullah; 14 November 1913 – 14 July 1958) was a cousin and brother-in-law of King Ghazi of the Hashemite Kingdom of Iraq and was regent for his first-cousin once removed, King Faisal II, from 4 April 1939 to 23 May 1953, when Faisal came of age. Abd al-Ilah also held the title of Crown Prince of Iraq from 1943.

Abd al-Ilah was killed along with the rest of the Iraqi royal family in the 14 July Revolution in 1958 that ended the Hashemite monarchy in Iraq. His body was mutilated, dragged across the streets of Baghdad, and eventually burnt.

Biography 

Son and heir of King Ali ibn Hussein of Hejaz, who was the elder brother of King Faisal I of Iraq, and brother of Aliya bint Ali. His family fled Hejaz when Ibn Saud of Nejd usurped his father's authority. Upon King Ghazi's death in an automobile accident, Abd al-Ilah assumed power in Iraq as regent for the underage King Faisal II.

1941 Iraqi coup d'état 
During World War II, Abd al-Ilah was deposed briefly by former Prime Minister Rashid Ali al-Kaylani. Rashid Ali led a pro-German coup d'état against Abd al-Ilah's pro-British government. After he fled the country, Abd al-Ilah was replaced as regent by Sharaf bin Rajeh, an ageing, religious relative of Faisal II. The deposed regent spent his time with former Prime Minister Nuri al-Said as a refugee in Amman. During his time in exile, Abd al-Ilah was a guest of his uncle Abdullah, the Emir of Transjordan.

On 2 May, the United Kingdom launched an offensive against the Iraqi rebels. On 26 May, The New York Times newspaper reported that Abd al-Ilah had called for an uprising of tribal and religious leaders to help him overthrow the insurgent government. He appealed specifically to the Iraqi people, the army and the police to accomplish "this heavy task".

By 2 June, Rashid Ali's "National Defence Government" had collapsed and Rashid Ali had fled to Iran. Abd al-Ilah returned to Baghdad and was restored as regent.

Working in tandem with Nuri al-Said, Abd al-Ilah pursued a moderate nationalist approach while maintaining close ties to the Allies.

In 1942, Wendell Willkie travelled to Britain and the Middle East as President Franklin D. Roosevelt's personal representative. In Iraq, Abdul Ilah held a lavish state dinner attended by Willkie.

In 1945, Abd al-Ilah visited the United States. He was the honoured guest at the first state dinner hosted by the new American First Lady, Bess Truman. The regent of "friendly Iraq" was awarded a Legion of Merit military decoration by President Harry S. Truman.

In 1953, Crown Prince Abd al-Ilah stepped down when Faisal II came of age. But he continued to be a close adviser of the young King, and an advocate of a pro-Western foreign policy.

In 1955, Iraq adopted the Baghdad Pact (also known as the Central Treaty Organization, or CENTO). The other members of the organization were Iran, Pakistan, Turkey and the United Kingdom. The organization's headquarters were initially located in Baghdad.

In May 1957, Saud of Saudi Arabia made an eight-day visit to Iraq. He was met on his arrival by Faisal II, Abd al-Ilah, and Prime Minister Nuri al-Said. It was the Saudi king's first ever visit to Iraq, and it commemorated Iraq's membership in the Arab Federation and its break with the United Arab Republic of Gamal Abdel Nasser.

14 July Revolution 
On 14 July 1958, a coup d'état led by Colonel Abd al-Karim Qasim toppled the government and brought an end to the Iraqi monarchy. In the ensuing violence brought on by the coup, Abd al-Ilah was killed, along with most of the Royal Family. The body of Crown Prince Abd al-Ilah was trailed on al Rashid street and was cut into pieces. According to the 21 July edition of Time magazine, Gamal Abdel Nasser's Middle East News Agency gleefully described the assassination of Crown Prince Abd al-Ilah: 'The people dragged Abd al-Ilah's body into the street like that of a dog and tore it limb from limb.' Then the mobs burned the body.

Private life
In his book Closet Queens, about 20th century British gay politicians, historian and biographer Michael Bloch mentions Abd al-Ilah (whom he calls Prince Abdulilah), on page 157, as being homosexual and a close friend of Alan Lennox-Boyd, 1st Viscount Boyd of Merton. Bloch says that after Abd al-Ilah was killed, "the revolutionaries discovered intimate letters from Lennox-Boyd among the Prince's papers, which they released to the world's press."

On page 159 of the book, Bloch says that Lennox-Boyd and Henry Channon organised a memorial service for their friend, the Prince, in 1958.

Military ranks and Awards 
Abd al-Ilah held the following ranks:
 Field Marshal, Royal Iraqi Army
 Marshal, Royal Iraqi Air Force
 Honorary Marshal, Royal Air Force

He was awarded the Legion of Merit (Chief Commander) on 1 June 1945.
 Poland (in exile): Order of the White Eagle, 1947

Hashemite genealogy

See also 

 Central Treaty Organization
 Coup d'état of 1941

Notes

Further reading

1913 births
1958 deaths
20th-century Royal Air Force personnel
Chief Commanders of the Legion of Merit
Executed Iraqi people
Field marshals of Iraq
Grand Croix of the Légion d'honneur
House of Hashim
Iraqi politicians
Iraqi Sunni Muslims
Leaders ousted by a coup
Marshals of the Royal Iraqi Air Force
1958 in Iraq
Murdered royalty
People executed by Iraq by firing squad
People murdered in Iraq
People from Taif
Princes of Iraq
Regents
Royal Air Force air marshals
World War II political leaders
1958 murders in Iraq
LGBT in Iraq
Heirs apparent who never acceded
Sons of kings
Non-inheriting heirs presumptive